Artavis Pierce (born May 17, 1996) is an American football running back for the DC Defenders of the XFL. He played college football at Oregon State.

Professional career

Chicago Bears
Pierce signed with the Chicago Bears as an undrafted free agent following the 2020 NFL Draft on April 28, 2020. He was placed on the reserve/COVID-19 list by the team on July 27, 2020, and activated six days later. He was waived on September 5, as part of final roster cuts, and re-signed to the practice squad the next day.

The Bears promoted Pierce to the active roster on September 29. He made his NFL debut in Week 6 against the Carolina Panthers as a special teams player, while his first carries came four weeks later against the Minnesota Vikings, during which he rushed three times for nine yards. Pierce's first touchdown was in Week 16, a victory over the Jacksonville Jaguars, with a three-yard rushing score that had been set up by a 23-yard run out of the Wildcat formation on the previous play.

On August 31, 2021, Pierce was waived by the Bears and re-signed to the practice squad the next day. However he was subsequently released on September 8, 2021. On October 5, 2021, Pierce was re-signed to the practice squad following injuries to multiple running backs on the active roster. He was waived from the practice squad on December 28, 2021.

Cleveland Browns
On January 5, 2022, Pierce was signed to the Cleveland Browns' practice squad.

DC Defenders 
On November 17, 2022, Pierce was drafted by the DC Defenders of the XFL. He was placed on the reserve list by the team on March 14, 2023.

References

External links
Chicago Bears bio
Oregon State Beavers bio

1996 births
Living people
Players of American football from Florida
Sportspeople from Polk County, Florida
American football running backs
Oregon State Beavers football players
Chicago Bears players
Cleveland Browns players
DC Defenders players